Molof (Ampas, Poule, Powle-Ma) is a poorly documented Papuan language spoken by about 200 people in Molof village, Senggi District, Keerom Regency.

Classification
Wurm (1975) placed it as an independent branch of Trans–New Guinea, but Ross (2005) could not find enough evidence to classify it. Søren Wichmann (2018) tentatively considers it to be a language isolate, as does Foley (2018). Usher (2020) tentatively suggests it may be a Pauwasi language.

Phonology
Molof has a small consonant inventory, but a large one for vowels.

Molof consonants, quoted by Foley (2018) from Donohue (n.d.):

Molof vowels (8 total), quoted by Foley (2018) from Donohue (n.d.):

Basic vocabulary
Basic vocabulary of Molof from Rumaropen (2005), quoted in Foley (2018):

{| 
|+ Molof basic vocabulary
! gloss !! Molof
|-
| ‘bird’ || au
|-
| ‘blood’ || mɪt
|-
| ‘bone’ || antai
|-
| ‘breast’ || mu
|-
| ‘ear’ || ou
|-
| ‘eat’ || nɪ
|-
| ‘egg’ || li
|-
| ‘eye’ || lum
|-
| ‘fire’ || tombe
|-
| ‘give’ || tui
|-
| ‘go’ || tuɨ
|-
| ‘ground’ || aigiman
|-
| ‘hair’ || era
|-
| ‘hear’ || ar/arai
|-
| ‘I’ || məik
|-
| ‘leg’ || vu
|-
| ‘louse’ || əlim
|-
| ‘man’ || lomoa
|-
| ‘moon’ || ar
|-
| ‘name’ || ti
|-
| ‘one’ || kwasekak
|-
| ‘road, path’ || mɪtnine
|-
| ‘see’ || lokea
|-
| ‘sky’ || mejor
|-
| ‘stone’ || rɨ
|-
| ‘sun’ || neman
|-
| ‘tongue’ || aifoma
|-
| ‘tooth’ || tɨ
|-
| ‘tree’ || war
|-
| ‘two’ || atati
|-
| ‘water’ || yat
|-
| ‘we’ || ti
|-
| ‘woman’ || anar
|-
| ‘you (sg)’ || in
|}

The following basic vocabulary words are from Voorhoeve (1971, 1975), as cited in the Trans-New Guinea database:

{| class="wikitable sortable"
! gloss !! Molof
|-
| head || emi
|-
| hair || ela
|-
| ear || ou
|-
| eye || lom
|-
| nose || toŋga
|-
| tooth || te
|-
| tongue || ai
|-
| leg || fu
|-
| louse || lem
|-
| bird || au
|-
| egg || le
|-
| blood || mat
|-
| bone || antai
|-
| skin || kant
|-
| breast || mu
|-
| tree || woar
|-
| man || lomo
|-
| woman || anale
|-
| sun || nei
|-
| moon || ar
|-
| water || jat; yat
|-
| fire || tombe
|-
| stone || le
|-
| road, path || mef
|-
| name || ti
|-
| eat || ne
|-
| one || kwasekak
|-
| two || ateti
|}

References

External links

Molof word list at TransNewGuinea.org

Languages of western New Guinea
Unclassified languages of New Guinea
Pauwasi languages